Birmingham Corporation Tramways operated a network of tramways in Birmingham from 1904 until 1953. It was the fourth largest tramway network in the UK behind London, Glasgow and Manchester.

Birmingham Corporation built all the tramways and leased the track to various companies.

Birmingham was a pioneer in the development of reserved trackways which served the suburban areas as the city grew in the 1920s and 1930s.

History

The first trams operated in Birmingham from 1872, and the network expanded throughout the late 19th century. Initially these were horse and steam operated, the first electric trams operated from 1901. Under the terms of the Tramways Act 1870 the Birmingham Corporation owned all of the tracks within the city boundaries, however, they were forbidden from operating the trams themselves, and so various private companies operated them under lease. It wasn't until 1904 that the Birmingham Corporation took advantage of new legislation, which allowed it to operate trams in its own right as the original concessions expired. By 1912, the corporation had taken over all of the privately operated lines, it also took over other district tramways as the city boundaries were expanded. BCT continued to expand the network into a comprehensive system, and also took over routes extending into the Black Country. The last new route to Stechford was opened in 1928.

Decline set in during the 1930s, when several tram lines were converted to trolleybus operation, as this was seen as being a more economic option than replacing worn out track and rolling stock. Several of the least used lines were also abandoned, and replaced by diesel buses. Reflecting the fact that it now operated buses and trolleybuses as well as trams, BCT changed its name to Birmingham City Transport in 1937.

However, most of the tram network remained in operation until large scale closures began in 1947. The last three lines to Short Heath, Pype Hayes and Erdington were closed simultaneously on 4 July 1953.

Trams eventually returned to the streets of Birmingham on 6 December 2015, after a 62-year gap, when the first part of the Midland Metro city-centre extension was opened to Bull Street tram stop.

Timeline

Routes

Depots and Works
 Arthur Street Depot see Coventry Road
 Birchfield Road Depot, acquired from Handsworth District Council 1911, converted to motorbus use 28 October 1925
 Bournbrook, Dawlish Road, acquired 1 January 1912, closed 11 July 1927 (replaced by Selly Oak)
 Cotteridge Depot, acquired from King's Norton and Northfield District Council 1912
 Coventry Road Depot (also known as Arthur Street Depot), opened 1907, converted to motorbus use 1 July 1951
 Handsworth Sub-Depot
 Highgate Road Depot, opened 25 November 1913
 Hockley Depot, acquired from Handsworth District Council 1912, converted to motorbus use 2 April 1939, (Motor buses ceased 2006)
 Kyotts Lake Road Works, opened 1907, closed August 1953
 Miller Street Depot, opened 4 January 1904, converted to motorbus use 4 July 1953
 Moseley Road Depot, opened 1907, converted to motorbus use 2 October 1949
 Rosebery Street Depot, opened 1 July 1906, converted to motorbus use 31 August 1947
 Selly Oak Depot, opened 8 July 1927, converted to motorbus use 6 July 1952
 Trafalgar Road Depot
 Tividale B.M.T.C.J. Works
 Washwood Heath Depot, opened 1907, converted to motorbus use 1 October 1950
 West Smethwick Depot
 Witton Depot, acquired 1912. Until 2011, Aston Manor Road Transport Museum

Tramcar fleet

Statistics

Surviving artefacts and infrastructure

Tramcars
 Vehicle 107 (1906) under restoration at Aston Manor Road Transport Museum
 Vehicle 395 (1911) rescued by City of Birmingham Museums and Galleries. Restored in 1953 and presented to Birmingham Science Museum. Now preserved in Thinktank, Birmingham Science Museum

Shelters
 One preserved at Crich Tramway Museum

Depots
Moseley Road Depot - Grade II listed.
Selly Oak Depot, Harborne Lane - now Storage Units.
Witton Depot
Silver Street, Kings Heath - now International Stock
Miller Street - First Corporation built depot, now used for storing buses by NXWM after privatisation of WMPTE.
Highgate Road. Closed to trams 1937. Used for buses until the 1950s.
Steam Tram coke yard, 1899 - Stratford Road/ College Road junction.

Track
 Edmund Street, Birmingham City Centre
 Rednal Terminus
 Manor Farm Park, Selly Oak  Tram Track reused (until 2020) in the sluice of the pond in the park.  Almost certainly from the tramway that ran down the Bristol Road, a few hundred yards away.

See also

History of Birmingham
Transport in Birmingham
Trolleybuses in Birmingham
Midland Metro
List of town tramway systems in the United Kingdom

References

Notes

Literature
 Great British Tramway Networks, Wingate H. Bett and John C. Gillham, Light Railway Transport League 1st edition 1940 and 2nd edition 1944
 The ABC of Birmingham City transport. Parts 1 & 2, W. A Camwell, Ian Allan 1950
 City of Birmingham Transport Department. 1904-1954: Brochure to commemorate the undertaking's jubilee, Birmingham Transport Committee 1954
 The demise of Birmingham's Trams, Gordon P. Laker - copy in Birmingham Central Library
 Birmingham Trams and Tramways, Colin Andrew Purdue - copy in Birmingham Central Library
 Memories of Birmingham's steam trams, C Gilbert, Light Railway Transport League 1966
 Short review of Birmingham Corporation tramways, Peter Laurence Hardy, H.J. Publications1971 
 Birmingham (British tramways in pictures, 3), R.J.S. Wiseman, Huddersfield, Advertiser Press, 1972, 
 Birmingham Transport, Alec G Jenson, Birmingham Transport Historical Group 1978 
 Birmingham City Transport, Malcolm, etc. Keeley, Transport Pub. Co 1978 
 Birmingham Corporation Trams and Trolleybuses, Archie Mayou, Senior Publications 1982 
 Birmingham Corporation Tramway Rolling Stock. The story of Birmingham tramcar design, development and maintenance, P.W. Lawson, Birmingham Transport Historical Group 1983
 Last Tram Down the Village and Other Memories of Yesterday's Birmingham, Ray Tennant and Jim Lyndon, BiginInk Ltd 1984 
 Memories of Birmingham's transport, A.N.H Glover, 1987 
 Birmingham in the Electric Tramway Era, D.F. Potter, Birmingham Transport Historical Group 1988 
 Memories of Birmingham Transport, D.R. Harvey Birmingham Transport Historical Group 1988 
 Birmingham Trams on Old Picture Postcards, John Marks, Reflections of a Bygone Age 1992 
 A Nostalgic Look at Birmingham Trams, 1933-53: The Northern Routes Vol 1, David Harvey, Silver Link Publishing Ltd 1993 
 A Nostalgic Look at Birmingham Trams, 1933-53: The Southern Routes - Bristol Road Routes, Cotteridge and the Moseley Road Routes, Plus Nechells and Bolton Road Vol 2, David Harvey, Silver Link Publishing Ltd 1994 
 A Nostalgic Look at Birmingham Trams, 1933-53: The Eastern and Western Routes - Including the Stechford Routes, the West Bromwich, Wednesbury and Dudley Routes and the Smethwick, Oldbury and Dudley Routes v. 3, David Harvey, Silver Link Publishing Ltd 1995 
 Birmingham Trams, Silver Link Publishing Ltd 1995 
 Birmingham Transport (Archive Photographs: Images of England), Keith Turner, Tempus Publishing Ltd 1998 
 The Tramways of the West Midlands, LRTA handbook 1999 
 Birmingham Corporation Transport, 1904-39, Paul Collins, Ian Allan Ltd 1999ISBN 0-7110-2627-0
 Birmingham Corporation Transport, 1939-69, Paul Collins, Ian Allan Ltd 1999ISBN 0-7110-2656-4
 Birmingham Transport (Sutton's Photographic History of Transport), Mike Hitches, Sutton Publishing 1999 
 Seeing Birmingham by Tram, Eric Armstrong, Tempus Publishing Ltd 2003 
 Roads & Rails of Birmingham 1900-1939, R.T. Coxon, Ian Allan Ltd. 1979

Video and DVD
 Birmingham trams and trolleybuses, Birmingham Transport Historical Group 1992, VHS, 90min, also DVD published by Online Video
 Another look at Birmingham's trams and buses, John Stanford, 1999 VHS

External links
 Birmingham Corporation Tramways at British Tramway Company Badges and Buttons
 32 archive pictures of Birmingham's once-sprawling tram system - Birmingham Mail
 Remembering Birmingham’s Trams - online exhibition by the National Tramway Museum

Transport in Birmingham, West Midlands
Tram transport in England
3 ft 6 in gauge railways in England
Railway companies established in 1904
Railway companies disestablished in 1953
British companies established in 1904
1904 establishments in England
1953 disestablishments in England